Louis Philippe Demers (September 16, 1863 – November 3, 1951) was a Canadian lawyer, professor, and politician.

Born in St-Georges d'Henryville, Canada East, the son of Alexis-Louis Demers, a Quebec politician, and Marie Goyette, Demers was educated at the College of St. Hyacinthe, Quebec and Laval University, Montreal. A lawyer, he was the head of the firm of Demer and DeLorimier in Montreal. He was a Professor of Commercial Law at Laval University, Montreal. He was first elected to the House of Commons of Canada for the electoral district of St. Johns—Iberville in the general elections of 1900. A Liberal, he was re-elected in 1904. He resigned in 1906 when he was appointed Puisne Judge, Superior Court. His brother, Marie Joseph Demers, was elected to replace him.

References
 
 The Canadian Parliament; biographical sketches and photo-engravures of the senators and members of the House of Commons of Canada. Being the tenth Parliament, elected November 3, 1904

1863 births
1951 deaths
Liberal Party of Canada MPs
Members of the House of Commons of Canada from Quebec
Judges in Quebec
People from Montérégie
Université Laval alumni
Academic staff of Université Laval